New Diana Independent School District is a public school district based in the community of Diana, Texas (USA).  The district is located in eastern Upshur County and extends into a small portion of northwestern Harrison County.

Schools
New Diana ISD has. Three campuses - 
New Diana High School (Grades 9-12)
New Diana Middle School (Grades 6 -8)
Robert F. Hunt Elementary School (Grades PreK-5)

In 2009, the school district was rated "recognized" by the Texas Education Agency.

References

External links
New Diana ISD
New Diana ISD - mirror site.

School districts in Upshur County, Texas
School districts in Harrison County, Texas